David Sandström (born 2 January 1975) is the drummer for hardcore punk group Refused. After Refused broke up, Sandström and the other members of Refused worked on a project entitled TEXT and released one album. Then David went on to do solo work. In 2008 he formed the hardcore punk band AC4 with Refused frontman Dennis Lyxzén, playing bass guitar.

Sandström states that before Refused formed he was a "glue-sniffing death metal kid" but eventually a fan of Step Forward, the embryo of Refused. As Step Forward called it quits and the friendship between Sandström and Dennis Lyxzén grew stronger, Lyxzén took him home and made him listen to Youth of Today's We're Not in This Alone album over and over again in a room alone.

David Sandström Overdrive 

After Refused's demise, Sandström formed his own band, David Sandström Overdrive. His first release under his own name was called Om det inte händer nåt innan imorgon så kommer jag.. (If nothing happens before tomorrow, I am going to...). Om det is about David's grandfather, and was sung in Swedish. The second album, The Dominant Need of Needy Soul Is to Be Needed was released in 2004. His third album is Go Down! and was released in May 2005 under the name David Sandström Overdrive. In October 2008 the fourth album was released, titled Pigs Lose on Razzia Records.

Albums

The Faint Sounds of Shovelled Earth 
Under the alias The Faint Sounds of Shovelled Earth
1998, Simba recordings

Text – ST 
as Member
2000, Demon Box Recording
2000, Desperate Fight Records
2001, Buddyhead

Om det inte händer nåt innan imorgon så kommer jag 
2000, Demonbox Recordings

The Dominant Need of the Needy Soul Is to Be Needed 
2004, Mofab Teg Recordings

Go Down! 
With David Sandström Overdrive.
2005, Mofab Teg Recordings

Pigs Lose 
With David Sandström Overdrive.
2008, Razzia Records

You're The Lotion On Darkness Knuckles As It Punches Light in the Face 
A Heavy Feather
2011, Razzia Records

Singles 
 Here's For Summer (2:14), 2005 Mofab Teg Recordings
 Not a Good Boy (2:27), 2008 Mofab Teg Recordings
 Lisa, Lisa (4:04), 2008 Razzia Records

References

External links 
Sandström's old website (archived)

Swedish drummers
Male drummers
Refused members
1975 births
People from Umeå
Living people
21st-century drummers